The English Benedictine Congregation (EBC) unites autonomous Roman Catholic Benedictine communities of monks and nuns and is technically the oldest of the nineteen congregations that are affiliated in the Benedictine Confederation.

History and administration

The EBC claims technical canonical continuity with a congregation of Benedictine abbeys in England erected by the Holy See in 1216, and which ceased to exist at the dissolution of the monasteries in 1535–1540. The actual origins of the present congregation lay with Catholic English expatriates in France, the Low Countries and Italy at the start of the 17th century, and the first monastery was founded at Douai in 1606; this is the ancestor of the present Downside Abbey. English exiles also joined the Italian Cassinese Congregation, and in 1607 two of these were "aggregated" to the extinct English congregation by the last surviving member of it, Dom Sigebert Buckley. He had been a monk of the Westminster Abbey re-founded by Queen Mary I of England, but dissolved again by Elizabeth I in 1550. The EBC's claim of continuity depends on this deed of aggregation, rather than survival of monastic life after the Dissolution.

In 2020 the EBC had houses in the United Kingdom, the United States, Peru, and Zimbabwe. In 2022, three communities of nuns – Kylemore Abbey (Ireland), Mariavall Abbey (Sweden) and Jamberoo Abbey (Australia) – were accepted into the EBC, bringing the number of houses and communities to 17.

Every four years the General Chapter of the EBC elects an Abbot President from among the ruling abbots and former ruling abbots with its jurisdiction. He or she is assisted by a number of officials, and periodically undertakes a Visitation of the individual houses. The purpose of the Visitation is the preservation, strengthening and renewal of the religious life, including the laws of the Church and the Constitutions of the congregation. The President may require by Acts of Visitation, that particular points in the Rule, the Constitutions and the law of the Church be observed.

The current Abbot President is Abbot Christopher Jamison, former Abbot of Worth Abbey.

Sexual abuse scandal 

The sexual abuse scandal in the EBC around the turn of the 21st century was a significant episode in a series of Catholic sex abuse cases in the United Kingdom. The events concerned ranged from the 1960s to the 2010s, and led to a number of EBC monks being laicized, convicted and imprisoned for the sexual abuse of children and vulnerable adults.

Houses

Houses of the Congregation in exile

Houses of the present Congregation

United Kingdom 
 Ampleforth Abbey, fdd 1608 at Dieulouard
 Belmont Abbey, fdd 1859
 Buckfast Abbey, fdd 1882
 Curzon Park Abbey (nuns), fdd 1868
 Douai Abbey, fdd 1615 in Paris
 Downside Abbey, fdd 1607 in Douai
 Ealing Abbey, fdd 1897
 Stanbrook Abbey (nuns), fdd 1625 in Cambrai
 Worth Abbey, fdd 1933

United States 
 Portsmouth Abbey, fdd 1918
 Saint Louis Abbey, fdd 1955
 Saint Anselm's Abbey, fdd 1923

Ireland 
 Kylemore Abbey (nuns), fdd 1665 in Ypres

Sweden 
 Mariavall Abbey (nuns), fdd 1957 as Lutheran

Australia 
 Jamberoo Abbey (nuns), fdd 1849 in Rydalmere

Dependent communities

Peru 
 Priory of the Incarnation, fdd 1981 in Tambogrande, from 2006 in Pachacamac and from May 2018 transferred to Lurín, in the buildings of the former Cistercian nunnery

Zimbabwe 
 Monastery of Christ the Word, fdd 1996

Defunct houses of the present Congregation 
 Colwich Abbey (nuns), fdd 1651 in Paris; merged to Stanbrook Abbey and closed in 2020
 Fort Augustus Abbey, fdd 1630 at Lamspringe, Scotland; closed in 1998

Membership 
In 2020, membership of the constituent houses was as follows. The table does not include the three houses added to the community in 2022.

References

External links 

 

Religious organizations established in the 1210s
1216 establishments in England
16th-century disestablishments in England
17th-century establishments in England
Benedictine congregations
Christian religious orders established in the 13th century
13th-century establishments in England

es:Congregación Inglesa#top